"Booti Call" is a song by American R&B group Blackstreet, recorded for the group's self-titled debut album (1994). The song was released as the second single for the album in July 1994.

Background
According to group member Teddy Riley, the song was written about his friend Mike Tyson, whose rape trial resulted in a conviction.

Track listing
 12", vinyl
"Booti Call" (K.C. Miami Mix) - 4:42 (feat. T-Pirate)
"Booti Call" (T.R. Pop Mix) - 4:21 (feat. T-Pirate)
"Booti Call" (T.R. Doggie Mix) - 7:01 (feat. T-Pirate)
"Booti Call" (Doggie Dub Mix) - 4:30
"Booti Call" (No Rap Radio Mix) - 4:21
"Booti Call" (Gotta Get U Home With Me Mix) - 4:06 (feat. T-Pirate)
"I Like the Way You Work" (T.R. Blackstreet Mix) - 5:18
"I Like the Way You Work" (Papa Lee Mix) - 4:53 (feat. Menton Smith)
"I Like the Way You Work" (T.R. Uptown Mix) - 4:04 (feat. Menton Smith)
"I Like the Way You Work" (Ballad Mix) - 4:10

 12", vinyl (Promo)
"Booti Call" (LP Version) - 4:17 (feat. T-Pirate)
"I Like the Way You Work" (LP Version) - 4:25 (feat. Nutta Butta)
"I Like the Way You Work" (LP Version) - 4:25 (feat. Nutta Butta)
"Booti Call" (LP Version) - 4:17 (feat. T-Pirate)

Personnel
Information taken from Discogs.
production – Markell Riley, Teddy Riley, Erick Sermon
rapping – Nutta Butta, T-Pirate
writing – A. Dickey, M. Graham, C. Hannibal, L. Little, M. Riley, T. Riley, E. Sermon, M. Smith, L. Sylvers
engineering assistant - Sprague Williams, Kimberly Smith

Charts

Notes

External links

1994 singles
Blackstreet songs
Song recordings produced by Erick Sermon
Song recordings produced by Teddy Riley
Songs written by Teddy Riley
Songs written by Leon Sylvers III
1994 songs
Interscope Records singles
Songs written by Larry Troutman
Songs written by Roger Troutman
Songs written by Erick Sermon
Songs written by George Clinton (funk musician)
Cultural depictions of Mike Tyson
Songs written by Garry Shider